This is a list of number-one songs in 1978 on the Italian charts compiled weekly by the Italian Hit Parade Singles Chart.

Chart history

Number-one artists

References

1978
1978 in Italian music
1978 record charts